David Pangai (born 21 September 1978 in Tonga) is a Tongan rugby league footballer who played his club football on the wing for the Sydney Roosters in the NRL.

Pangai has also appeared on several occasions for the Tonga national rugby league team with his most recent international games coming during the 2006 Federation Shield competition.

References

1986 births
Living people
Expatriate rugby league players in Australia
David
Rugby league wingers
Tonga national rugby league team players
Tongan expatriate rugby league players
Tongan expatriate sportspeople in Australia
Tongan rugby league players